"You're So Close" is a song by English musician Peter Murphy, from his fourth solo studio album Holy Smoke (1992). Written by Murphy and Paul Statham, the song was released in 1992 as the second single from the album, through Beggars Banquet and RCA Records. Despite not matching with the success of the lead single off the album, "The Sweetest Drop", the song charted on Billboard Modern Rock Tracks, peaking at number 18.

Music
The song starts with a low, ascending keyboard loop and understated bassline. The chorus, which was described to have "a jaw-dropping impact" comes through the overdub of Murphy's "almost conversational lead lyrics" and his crooning, crying backing vocals. After the second chorus, the song returns to the "calm style of the opening", before returning for one last verse and extended chorus.

Critical reception
In his review for Holy Smoke, Ned Raggett of Allmusic praised the song's "anthemic, stunning chorus and a flat-out brilliant vocal." In his separate track review, Raggett described the song as "a sleeper hit of sorts from Holy Smoke" and "a note-perfect combination of righteous rock energy and often astonishing beauty." He also criticized the fact that the song wasn't the lead single, stating: "Quite why this didn't surface as the lead single instead of "The Sweetest Drop" will have to remain a mystery for the gods to deduce." High Fidelity News noted the song's "sinister crawl", interpreting that the song "suggest a man who is finally finding his own musical identity." Dave Thompson, the author of The Dark Reign of Gothic Rock: In the Reptile House with the Sisters of Mercy, Bauhaus and The Cure, described the song as "claustrophobic."

Track listing

Personnel
Peter Murphy – vocals, production, composition, guitar (6); keyboards (7)

The Hundred Men
Terl Bryant – drums, percussion
Eddie Branch – bass
Peter Bonas – guitar, acoustic guitar

Other personnel
Mike Thorne – production, synclavier
Jason Appleton – production assistant
Jack Skinner – mastering
Fernando Kral – engineering, mixing
Stuart Every – assistant engineer
Laura Janisse – production assistant

Chart performances

References

External links

"You're So Close" official music video

1992 songs
1992 singles
Peter Murphy (musician) songs
Beggars Banquet Records singles
RCA Records singles
Songs written by Paul Statham
Song recordings produced by Mike Thorne